Bureau of Mines may refer to:

 Bureau of Mines (Taiwan) in Taiwan
 United States Bureau of Mines in the United States